The Life and Adventures of Mishka Yaponchik is a crime television series, based on real events. Directed by Sergey Ginzburg.

Internationally  language  title is a Once Upon a Time in Odessa.

Plot 
The film tells the story of the legendary Odessa's Robin Hood, Mikhail (Moshe-Yaakov) Vinnitsky. He came out of prison, returned to Odessa and cobble together their own band. Mishka Yaponchik becomes king of thieves. His raids become more wittier. The storyline of the series love story woven thief to a local rich man's daughter. The film is based on real events.

The authors of the series did not pursue the goal to create a thoroughly historically tied now, their goal, a love story based on the works of Isaak Babel.

Cast
 Yevgeny Tkachuk as Mishka Yaponchik
 Elena Shamova as Tsilya Averman, Mishka Yaponchik's wife  
 Alexey Filimonov as Izya Mayorchik
 Artyom Tkachenko as Rzhevskij-Rajewski
 Igor Savochkin as  Shark, a bandit
 Anatoly Kot as Stotsky
 Oleg Shkolnik as Meer Vinnitsky
 Andrey Urgant as Hepner Yoval Lazarevich
Pavel Priluchny as Leonid Utesov
Kirill Polukhin as Grigory Kotovsky
 Valentin Gaft as Mendel Hersh
 Rimma Markova as Pani Basia
Sergei Ginzburg as Deyev, regiment commander

Soundtrack 
Radda Erdenko  — Spinning, Spinning the Blue Bow
Karina Gabrielyan — Tumbalalaika
Radda Erdenko, Karina Gabrielyan —  Chiribim-chirib (The Magic Song of the eternal Purim)
Karina Gabrielyan — Bublički
Radda Erdenko — Joh-choh-choh
Karina Gabrielyan —  Yes, My Dove
Radda Erdenko — Аy Аy Нora
Karina Gabrielyan — Abi Gezunt
Vladimir Dolinsky — Lemonchik
The Barry Sisters — Bei Mir Bistu Shein
Alik Farber — Rachel, To You Are Dead, You To Me Like!

References

External links

 The Life and Adventures of Mishka Yaponchik at the ruskino

Russian-language television shows
2010s Russian television series
2011 Russian television series debuts
2011 Russian television series endings
Russian crime television series
Channel One Russia original programming
Russian drama television series
Russian television miniseries
Odesa in fiction
Russian biographical television series